Verdon may refer to:

People
Verdon (surname)

Places

France
 Verdon, Dordogne, in the Dordogne département
 Verdon, Marne, in the Marne département
 Vinon-sur-Verdon, an old French town in the département of Var, Provence-Alpes-Côte d'Azur region
 Le Verdon-sur-Mer, in the Gironde département
 Verdun, a small north-eastern French city famous for various 18th-20th century military campaigns

United States
Verdon Township, Aitkin County, Minnesota
Verdon, Nebraska
Verdon, South Dakota

Other
 Verdon college, a co-educational Roman Catholic high school in Invercargill, New Zealand
 Verdon (river), a river in south-eastern France, left tributary of the Durance
Verdon Gorge (French: Gorges du Verdon or Grand canyon du Verdon), a river canyon in south-eastern France
 The Hispano-Suiza Verdon, a license-built version of the Rolls-Royce RB.44 Tay